Benthoxystus is a genus of sea snails, marine gastropod mollusks in the family Muricidae, the murex snails or rock snails.

Species
Species within the genus Benthoxystus include:

 Benthoxystus columnarius (Hedley & May, 1908)
 Benthoxystus petterdi (Brazier in Crosse, 1870)

References

 
Gastropod genera